Namrata Shirodkar (born 22 January 1972) is a former Indian actress and model primarily known for her work in Hindi films. She won the Femina Miss India title in 1993. 

She is best known for her works in films such as the Kachche Dhaage (1999), Ezhupunna Tharakan (1999), Vaastav: The Reality (1999) and Pukar (2000), for which she was nominated for the IIFA Best Supporting Actress Award, Astitva  (2000), Dil Vil Pyar Vyar (2002), LOC Kargil (2003), and the crossover cinema Bride and Prejudice (2004), which was successful overseas, particularly in the UK. She married Telugu actor Mahesh Babu in 2005.

Early life
Namrata Shirodkar was born on 22 January 1972 in a Maharashtrian family of Goan origin. She is the elder sister of actress Shilpa Shirodkar, and the grand daughter of noted Marathi actress Meenakshi Shirodkar, who starred in Brahmachari (1938).

Modelling career
Shirodkar worked as a model, and was crowned Miss India in 1993. She represented India in the Miss Universe pageant and finished in sixth place. The same year, she also represented India in the Miss Asia Pacific contest and was chosen as first runner-up.

Acting career
She appeared in a brief role as a child artiste with Shatrughan Sinha in the 1977 film Shirdi Ke Sai Baba.

Shirodkar's debut film was meant to be Purab Ki Laila Pachhim Ki Chhaila, with Akshay Kumar and Sunil Shetty in the lead and music by Nadeem Shravan. This movie was never released. The movie was completed after her retirement and the title was changed to Hello India but it is still awaiting release. Shirodkar made her actual debut with a small role in the film Jab Pyaar Kisise Hota Hai (1998), along with Salman Khan and Twinkle Khanna. She then went on to star in the hit films Vaastav and Kachche Dhaage (both 1999). Her performance was appreciated and she became a known name in Bollywood.

Personal life
In 2000, Shirodkar met Telugu cinema actor Mahesh Babu on the sets of their movie Vamsi. They began dating shortly after filming finished. They married on 10 February 2005 at the JW Marriott Mumbai Juhu during the shooting of Athadu. Shirodkar now lives in Hyderabad with her husband. The couple has two children, a son and a daughter.

Filmography

References

External links
 
 
 

1972 births
20th-century Indian actresses
21st-century Indian actresses
Actresses from Mumbai
Actresses in Hindi cinema
Actresses in Malayalam cinema
Actresses in Marathi cinema
Actresses in Kannada cinema
Actresses in Telugu cinema
Femina Miss India winners
Female models from Mumbai
Indian film actresses
Living people
Miss Universe 1993 contestants
Mithibai College alumni
Goan people
Telugu film producers
Indian film producers